The 2020–21 Ford Trophy was the 50th season of The Ford Trophy, the List A cricket tournament that was played in New Zealand. It was the tenth in a sponsorship deal between New Zealand Cricket and Ford Motor Company. It started on 29 November 2020 and finished on 6 March 2021. Auckland were the defending champions.

On 15 June 2020, New Zealand Cricket announced the first round of contracts for domestic teams ahead of the 2020–21 season. The full schedule for the tournament was confirmed on 8 October 2020.

Following the conclusion of the group stage, Northern Districts and Wellington progressed to the preliminary final, with Canterbury topping the group and advancing directly to the tournament's final. Northern Districts won the rain-affected preliminary final by 138 runs to join Canterbury in the final of the tournament. In the final, Canterbury beat Northern Districts by eight wickets to win their 15th title.

Points table

 Advanced to the Final
 Advanced to the Preliminary Final

Fixtures

Round 1

Round 2

Round 3

Round 4

Round 5

Round 6

Round 7

Round 8

Round 9

Round 10

Finals

References

External links
 Series home at ESPN Cricinfo

Ford Trophy
2020–21 New Zealand cricket season
Ford Trophy